"I Know You See It" is a song written and recorded by American rapper Yung Joc. Produced by Kochease, the song features vocals from Brandy "Ms. B" Hambric. It was released as the second single from his debut album New Joc City. It reached number 17 on the Billboard Hot 100 and number five on the U.S. Hot R&B/Hip-Hop Songs chart. It also peaked at number five on the U.S. Rap Songs chart. The music video for the song first premiered on MTV's Making the Video.

Background
The chorus' lyrics interpolate a famous children's counting rhyme in English-speaking countries (Eeny Meeny Miny Moe).

Music video
In the music video Yung Joc is partying at his house showing around his "exclusive tour" with girls. The ending of the video features a short scene where he starts to sing his song "Dope Boy Magic."

Charts

Weekly charts

Year-end charts

References

2006 singles
2006 songs
Yung Joc songs
Bad Boy Records singles
Songs based on children's songs